The men's 50 kilometre classical cross-country skiing competition at the 2010 Winter Olympics in Vancouver, Canada was held on 28 February at Whistler Olympic Park in Whistler, British Columbia at 09:30 PST. on the final day of the Games.

The 50 kilometre has been skated as a mass start event at the World Championships since 2005 and since the 2006 Winter Olympics. Italy's Giorgio Di Centa was the defending Olympic champion though that event was held in the freestyle technique. Norway's Petter Northug was the reigning world champion though that was also in the freestyle technique. The last World Cup event in the 50 km classical took place in Trondheim, Norway on 14 March 2009 and was won by Sami Jauhojärvi of Finland. All three medalists of the shorter 30 kilometre event were scheduled to participate in the 50 km race; in that race, Marcus Hellner of Sweden came first, Petter Northug was 11th, Giorgio Di Centa was 12th, and Sami Jauhojärvi failed to finish.

Results
There were 55 participants in this event.

Defending Olympic champion di Centa finished 11th. Jauhojärvi finished 20th. At the 12.3 km mark, the top three were Södergren (who finished ninth), 2007 champion Hjelmeset (who finished 17th), and Legkov (who finished 14th). By the halfway mark, the top three were Johnsrud Sundby (who finished 15th), Richardsson (who finished seventh), and Olsson. France's Gaillard (who finished 19th) led at the 39.2 km mark, followed by Cologna (who finished tenth), and Legkov. Northug's 0.3 second victory over Teichmann is the closest 50 km event in Olympic history, beating the previous record of 0.8 seconds set at the previous Olympics when di Centa edged out Russia's Yevgeny Dementyev. Additionally, he is the sixth Norwegian to win the Olympic 50 km event, but the first since Bjørn Dæhlie's second triumph at the 1998 Winter Olympics in Nagano. The medals were presented at the closing ceremony at BC Place Stadium in Vancouver that same evening.

References

External links
 2010 Winter Olympics results: Men's 50 km, Mass Start Classic, from vancouver2010.com; retrieved 2010-02-28.

Men's cross-country skiing at the 2010 Winter Olympics
Men's 50 kilometre cross-country skiing at the Winter Olympics